The 1970–71 NCAA University Division men's basketball season began in December 1970, progressed through the regular season and conference tournaments, and concluded with the 1971 NCAA University Division basketball tournament championship game on March 27, 1971, at the Astrodome in Houston, Texas. The UCLA Bruins won their seventh NCAA national championship with a 68–62 victory over the Villanova Wildcats.

Season headlines 

 The NCAA introduced a new rule prohibiting any team which turned down an invitation to the NCAA tournament from playing in any other postseason tournament. The effect of the rule is to prevent NCAA Tournament invitees from accepting a National Invitation Tournament instead, diminishing the quality of the pool of teams eligible to play in the NIT.
 UCLA won its fifth NCAA championship in a row, seventh overall, and seventh in eight seasons. In the Pacific 8 Conference, it also won its fifth of what ultimately would be 13 consecutive conference titles.

Season outlook

Pre-season polls 

The Top 20 from the AP Poll and Coaches Poll during the pre-season.

Conference membership changes

Regular season

Conference winners and tournaments

Informal championships

Statistical leaders

Postseason tournaments

NCAA tournament

Final Four 

 Third Place – Western Kentucky 77, Kansas 75

National Invitation tournament

Semifinals & finals 

 Third Place – St. Bonaventure 92, Duke 88

Awards

Consensus All-American teams

Major player of the year awards 

 Naismith Award: Austin Carr, Notre Dame
 Helms Player of the Year: Austin Carr, Notre Dame, & Sidney Wicks, UCLA
 Associated Press Player of the Year: Austin Carr, Notre Dame
 UPI Player of the Year: Austin Carr, Notre Dame
 Oscar Robertson Trophy (USBWA): Sidney Wicks, UCLA
 Sporting News Player of the Year: Sidney Wicks, UCLA

Major coach of the year awards 

 Associated Press Coach of the Year: Al McGuire, Marquette
 Henry Iba Award (USBWA): John Wooden, UCLA
 NABC Coach of the Year: Jack Kraft, Villanova
 UPI Coach of the Year: Al McGuire, Marquette
 Sporting News Coach of the Year: Al McGuire, Marquette

Other major awards 

 Frances Pomeroy Naismith Award (Best player under 6'0): Charles Johnson, California
 Robert V. Geasey Trophy (Top player in Philadelphia Big 5): Ken Durrett, La Salle
 NIT/Haggerty Award (Top player in New York City metro area): Charlie Yelverton, Fordham

Coaching changes 

A number of teams changed coaches during the season and after it ended.

References